Kyle Academy (Scottish Gaelic: Acadamaidh a' Chaoil) is a non-denominational secondary school in Ayr, serving the south east of Ayr in South Ayrshire. The roll of Kyle Academy school in 2021–2022 was 821 with a staffing complement equivalent to 58 full time teachers. The current head teacher of Kyle Academy is Mary Byrne  who took over the position of head teacher from Lyndsay McRoberts, who was also joint head teacher of nearby Ayr Academy.

Kyle Academy ranked as the 33rd best state school in Scotland in 2017, and is regarded as one of the best performing secondary schools in South Ayrshire. By 2020, Kyle Academy had dropped in its ranks to the 59th best performing state school in Scotland, and in 2022 dropped further to 92nd.

History
Kyle Academy opened in 1979. and started with 120 first year pupils.  it has an enrollment of 817 pupils, in 6 year groups. Its main feeder schools are Forehill Primary and Ayr Grammar Primary.

The school building itself is situated next to the River Ayr, west of the A77 trunk road. Prior to becoming the site of Kyle Academy, the site was rural and farm land and at some period in its history the land was used for mining. In addition, there was also a dye works and fever hospital in the vicinity close to where Kyle Academy is now situated. Nearby, the Kyle Union poorhouse in Ayr was built in 1857-60 on Holmston Road, with the first Governor and Matron being appointed in April 1860. The buildings provided accommodation for 150 inmates.

Extension
As part of South Ayrshire's public–private partnership, an extension was constructed in 2007. The separate new annex holds a 300-seat, multimedia equipped assembly hall/theatre, e-learning suite and meeting rooms, shows can often be performed here.

School profile
Kyle Academy has a large staff consisting of a senior leadership team of one head teacher and three depute head teachers, 16 principal teachers (curriculum), four principal teachers of guidance, and one principal teacher of pupil support. The percentage of young people at Kyle Academy with a free school meals entitlement is 8.1%. Attendance is broadly in line with local South Ayrshire and national figures across Scotland. Exclusions of students at Kyle Academy are below local and national averages.

Kyle Academy is part of the Kyle Cluster with associated schools, Grammar Primary School, Forehill Primary School & Early Years Centre and Wallacetown Early Years Centre. Kyle Academy was last inspected by Education Scotland in March 2013. The report was published in June 2013.

National performance
In 2017, Kyle Academy was ranked as the 33rd best state school in Scotland. Kyle Academy was one of two secondary schools in South Ayrshire to rank within the top 50 – Marr College in Troon was ranked at 38.

Progress in secondary schools in Scotland is measured using national benchmarking measures from Education Scotland and is based on information related to school leavers rather than year groups. The results achieved by pupils in Kyle Academy are compared to the results of a virtual comparator used across Scotland. A virtual comparator is determined by the Scottish Government who is responsible for selecting at random 10 pupils from across Scotland with similar characteristics to pupils. This is done for every pupil in S4 to S6 in Kyle Academy. This enables a fair comparison with pupils of similar needs and backgrounds from across Scotland.

A high degree of children in Kyle Academy make very good progress from prior levels of attainment in literacy and numeracy. Almost all children at Kyle Academy leave the school with qualifications in both literacy and numeracy. The percentage of children leaving school who have achieved awards in both literacy and numeracy continues to be significantly greater than the virtual comparator and the national figure used to compare performance at Kyle Academy.

Uniform
Kyle Academy has a uniform policy consisting of the following:

 White shirt
 School tie
 Black or grey skirts, trousers, jumpers (V neck), cardigans and jackets
 Blazers
 Black shoes rather than trainers

Despite the school uniform policy stating black shoes, boys at Kyle Academy frequently opt to wear smart brown brogue type shoes.

Staff at Kyle Academy strongly encourage the wearing of Kyle Academy school blazers across all age groups. School dress and uniform worn by pupils is monitored on a daily basis as children arrive in school. Parents are contacted where issues arise.

Notable former pupils
 Katy Clark, politician
 Ryan Stevenson, footballer

References

External links

 2012 archive Kyle Academy's page on Scottish Schools Online
 Kyle Academy on South Ayrshire Council website
 archive of 2004 Kyle Academy Inspection Report, by HM Inspectorate of Education

Secondary schools in South Ayrshire
Schools in Ayr
1979 establishments in Scotland
Educational institutions established in 1979